Les Victoires du jazz are a French annual awards ceremony devoted to Jazz. First appeared in the Victoires de la Musique in 1986 and awarded within the Victoires de la musique classique from 1994, trophies related to jazz are the subject of a specific ceremony, called "Victories of Jazz" since 2002. The award is recognized internationally. The award is internationally perceived. 

The charts below shows all jazz-related awards at the Grammys (all ceremonies) since 1986.

Winners

Jazz musician of the year 
 1986 : Didier Lockwood
 1987 : Stéphane Grappelli
 1988 : Michel Petrucciani
 1990 : Michel Petrucciani

Artist or group of the year 
 2002 : Emmanuel Bex Trio BFG (avec Glenn Ferris et Simon Goubert)
 2003 : Sylvain Luc Trio Sud
 2004 : Lionel Belmondo et Stéphane Belmondo
 2005 : Stéphane Belmondo
 2006 : Daniel Mille
 2007 : Hadouk Trio
 2008 : Andy Emler MégaOctet
 2009 : Marc Ducret
 2010 : Médéric Collignon Jus de Bocse
 2011 : Jean-Philippe Viret Trio
 2012 : Bojan Z
 2013 : Ibrahim Maalouf
 2014 : Émile Parisien

Jazz revelation of the year 
 1996 : Jean-Yves D'Angelo

Instrumental revelation (Frank Ténot prize) 
 2003 : Baptiste Trotignon
 2004 : Franck Avitabile New Trio
 2005 : Pierre Bertrand et Nicolas Folmer pour le Paris Jazz Big Band
 2006 : Le Sacre du Tympan
 2007 : Médéric Collignon Jus de Bocse
 2008 : Géraldine Laurent et Yaron Herman, lauréats ex-aequo
 2009 : Emile Parisien Quartet
 2010 : Ibrahim Maalouf
 2011 : Anne Paceo Triphasé
 2012 : Sandra Nkaké
 2013 : Thomas Enhco
 2014 : Vincent Peirani

Vocal artist or group of the year 
 2002 : Anne Ducros
 2003 : Anne Ducros
 2006 : Elisabeth Kontomanou
 2008 : André Minvielle
 2009 : Bernard Lubat
 2010 : Elise Caron
 2011 : David Linx and Maria João

Jazz instrumental album of the year 
 1985 : Didier Lockwood, Out of the Blues
 1992 : Michel Petrucciani, Playground
 1993 : André Ceccarelli, Hat Snatcher
 1994 : Michel Petrucciani, Promenade with Duke
 1995 : Marcel Azzola, L'Accordéoniste et Eddy Louiss & Michel Petrucciani, Conférence de presse
 1997 : Richard Galliano, New York Tango
 2003 : Jacky Terrasson, Smile (Blue Note / EMI)
 2004 : Lionel Belmondo et Stéphane Belmondo, Hymne au soleil (B-Flat recordings/Discograph)
 2005 : Stéphane Belmondo, Wonderland (B-Flat recordings/Discograph)
 2006 : Lionel Belmondo, Stéphane Belmondo et Yusef Lateef, Influence (B-Flat recordings/Discograph)
 2007 : Michel Portal Birdwatcher et Bojan Z, Xenophonia (Ex Aequo)
 2008 : Pierre de Bethmann, Oui (Nocturne)
 2009 : Orchestre national de jazz Daniel Yvinec, Around Robert Wyatt (Bee jazz/Abeille Musique)
 2010 : Andy Emler Megaoctet, Crouch, touch, engage (Naïve)
 2011 : Éric Legnini & The Afro Jazz Beat, The Vox (Discograph)
 2013 : Médéric Collignon et le Jus de Bocse, À la recherche du roi frippé, (Just Looking Production)
 2014 : Thomas de Pourquery & Supersonic, Thomas de Pourquery & Supersonic Play Sun Ra, (Quark/L'Autre Distribution)

Blues album of the year 
 2003 : Jean-Jacques Milteau

Midem prize 
 2003 : Esbjörn Svensson 
 2004 : Norah Jones (Blue Note/EMI)
 2006 : Tineke Postma

People's choice prize 
 2003 : Captain Mercier 
 2004 : Lionel et Stéphane Belmondo Hymne au soleil (B-Flat recordings/Discograph)
 2005 : Erik Truffaz, Saloua
 2009 : Patrick Artero Vaudoo (Plus Loin/Harmonia Mundi)

International Artiste or group of the year 
 2004 : Richard Bona (Universal, France/Universal)
 2005 : Madeleine Peyroux

International Album French production of the year 
 2010 : Chamber Music : Ballaké Sissoko & Vincent Segal, (No Format/Universal)
 2011 : À fable : Tigran Hamasyan, Verve Records

Honor award 
 2010 : Marcus Miller et George Benson
 2011 : André Ceccarelli
 2012 : Maceo Parker et Jean-Philippe Allard

References

External links 
http://www.francetv.fr/emissions/les-victoires-de-la-musique
http://news.allaboutjazz.com/the-7th-edition-of-the-victoires-du-jazz.php

Jazz awards
French awards